Abdul Vaheed (mononymously known as "Kamal") is a well-known author in the Rajasthani language.

Personal life
He was born on 17 April 1936 in Narsara village of Churu district in Rajasthan. He has a MA and BED from Northwestern Jackson College. He is associated with many organizations like Lok Kala Kendra, Bikaner. He currently works in the education field.

Works
In Rajasthani he wrote "Ukalti Dharti, Uphanto Abhoo" (Poetry), "Gali Ra Ladesar" (Rajasthani Novel for Children), "Tu Jani Ka Main Jani"(Rajathani Drama), "Gharanoo" Rajasthani Novel [Sahitya Akademi Awarded], "Howde Re Dhoro" (Rajasthani Novel for Children), "Rupali" (Rajasthani Novel), etc. while in Hindi he has written Desh ka Sipahi and Thandi Mitti, as well as Char Kot (Hindi Drama).

Awards
He was awarded the Sahitya Akademi Award in 2001 for his Rajasthani novel Gharano, envisaging a harmony among different religions. The central plot element of the novel is the killing of a newborn girl in the feudal arrangement of Rajasthani society.

He has also won the Rajasthani Bhasha Sahitya Sanskriti Academy, Nehru Bal Sahitya Puraskar, Shivchand Bharatiya Puraskar, Mahendra Jajodiya Sahitya Puraskar and Allahajilaibal Mand Sansthan awards.

References

External links
 Sahni, Azmi honoured

Rajasthani-language writers
Rajasthani people
Recipients of the Sahitya Akademi Award in Rajasthani
Living people
People from Churu district
Poets from Rajasthan
1936 births
Indian male poets
20th-century Indian poets
20th-century Indian male writers